Seowonju station, is a railway station in Jijeong-myeon, Wonju, South Korea. It is served by the Gangneung Line and Jungang Line. The station belongs to Jungang Line opened on 25 September 2012. The Gangneung Line opened on December 22, 2017, ahead of the 2018 Winter Olympics in Pyeongchang.

References

External links
 Seowonju Station

Railway stations in Gangwon Province, South Korea
Railway stations opened in 2012